Brechin Castle is a castle  in Brechin, Angus, Scotland. The castle was constructed in stone during the 13th century. Most of the current building dates to the early 18th century, when extensive reconstruction was carried out by architect Alexander Edward for James Maule, 4th Earl of Panmure, between approximately 1696 and 1709. The castle is a  Category A listed building and the grounds are included in the Inventory of Gardens and Designed Landscapes in Scotland.

History
The grounds have been in the Ramsay family since the 12th century. In 1782, under the terms of a Maule will, William Ramsay adopted the name William Ramsay Maule, thereafter uniting the family names. Ramsay-Maule appears to have remodelled the frontage to a fashionable Georgian style at this time.

The seat of the Ramsay clan was moved from Dalhousie Castle in Midlothian to Brechin Castle in the early 20th century. The castle is the home of the Earl of Dalhousie, the clan chieftain of Clan Maule of Panmure in Angus, and Clan Ramsay of Dalhousie.

Marie Stewart, Countess of Mar entertained her brother-in-law, the Earl of Huntly at Brechin in September 1593. She hosted John Taylor the Water Poet, and King James on his return to Scotland in 1617. She had inventories made of the contents and furnishings of Brechin Castle in 1611 and 1622. Brechin Castle has been a stronghold of the Ramsay family since around 1645.

The formal gardens date to the early 18th century. Agriculture and forestry largely dominate the estate grounds, but tourists can stay at several guest lodges on the property.

The castle has been Category A Listed since 1971. The summary states that the battlemented flank walls were added in the mid-1800s, the building was remodelled 1854 and that a tower was added in 1863. Other modifications were also made in that era.

A 1990s addition to the grounds is Brechin Castle Centre, described as a "Country Park with Cafe and Garden Centre, plus loads of kids activities in the Park and in a Yard Play Area." As of 2018 the castle and gardens were open to the public in June/July.

On September 11, 2022, the royal cortège carrying the body of Queen Elizabeth II from Balmoral Castle to the Palace of Holyroodhouse in Edinburgh made a private, 45 minute stop at Brechin Castle to allow the drivers and participants to rest.

Sale of the castle
In 2019, the building and 70-acre grounds of Brechin Castle were put up for sale, with James Ramsay, 17th Earl of Dalhousie and chief of Clan Ramsay citing prohibitive upkeep costs as the motivating factor. A news report stated that the castle has eight reception rooms, 16 bedrooms and 10 bathrooms. 

Another news report made this statement: "Of the early medieval building little evidence remains. The oldest part of the current castle is the kitchen block, where can be seen a stone bearing the date 1703, but in 1711 major renovations were made which gave the building its current form". Edzell and Invermark and the family businesses – including Brechin Castle Garden Centre and Peggy Scott’s – were not being sold.

See also
Montrose Basin

References

External links

Dalhousie Estates - Brechin Castle
Engraving of Brechin castle by James Fittler in the digitised copy of Scotia Depicta, or the antiquities, castles, public buildings, noblemen and gentlemen's seats, cities, towns and picturesque scenery of Scotland, 1804 at National Library of Scotland

Castles in Angus, Scotland
Category A listed buildings in Angus, Scotland
Listed castles in Scotland
Inventory of Gardens and Designed Landscapes
Gardens in Angus, Scotland
Clan Ramsay